Aufi or Funkturm Aufhausen is the name of the police radio tower in Aufhausen, Germany (part of Geislingen an der Steige).

The Aufi is a  radio tower in steel and concrete, with a diameter of 6 metres. It is one of the thinnest steel-and-concrete towers in the world. In the 1960s and 70s measurements of static were made on this tower. It is not accessible to the public.

See also
 List of towers

External links
 
 http://www.skyscraperpage.com/diagrams/?b46980

Communication towers in Germany
Buildings and structures in Regensburg (district)
Swabian Jura